Fischer Sports is an Austrian winter sports equipment manufacturing company, more specifically Nordic skiing, Alpine skiing and ice hockey equipment. Winter sports equipment include skis, boots, bindings, and accessories (bags, backpacks). For ice hockey, Fischer produces sticks, skates, pucks, blades, jerseys, and protective gear (jockstraps, socks, gloves, and visors).

The company's clothing line includes t-shirts, polo shirts, jackets, pants, hoodies, raincoats, knit caps, gloves, kerchiefs, and socks.

History
The company was founded in 1924 by Josef Fischer Sr., a cartwright, in Ried im Innkreis, northeast of Salzburg, Austria. In addition to making wagons, he made an occasional pair of skis. By 1938, the company had significantly expanded its ski manufacturing, with 30 employees, and sales of handmade skis in the United States reached 2,000 pairs. Following the conclusion of World War II, Josef Fischer Jr. became involved in the reconstruction of the company.

In 1949, Fischer developed the first ski press to speed up production, which was still by hand. By 1958, the company employed 137 craftsmen, and was manufacturing 53,000 pairs of skis annually. In that year, Fischer adopted its three-triangle logo.  In 1964, the company completed a new factory on the outskirts of town, featuring a state-of-the-art computerized sawmill. Fischer also introduced metal skis for the first time, on which Egon Zimmerman won the downhill at the 1964 Winter Olympics. By 1967, the company had 775 employees, and produced 330,000 pairs of skis.
The company's research efforts over the years include skis for racing, including alpine skiing, cross-country skiing, and skis for attempting the world speed record.

In the early 70s, Fischer became the biggest ski manufacturer in the world. The Europa 77, with its fibre-glass technology, was revolutionary. This was the foundation to capture the Scandinavian market. Franz Klammer won the Olympics in 1976 on Fischer C4 skis. In 1988, Fischer opened the factory in Mukachevo, Ukraine.

2002 was the year of Fischer's stock buy-back. Since then, Fischer has been 100% family-owned.

Fischer Tennis division was sold to tennis accessories manufacturer Pacific Entermark GmbH in 2009.

Success in professional sports
At the Winter Olympic Games in Sochi 39 gold, 36 silver and 35 bronze medals were awarded to athletes with Fischer equipment: a total of 108 medals, which were won mainly in the Nordic disciplines. This surpassed the result at the Winter Olympic Games in Vancouver 2010 (74 medals). T

The Norwegian athlete Marit Bjørgen, who is equipped by Fischer, is the best Olympic cross country skier of all time. In Sochi she won three gold medals. US-American Joss Christensen is the first Olympic champion in the Alpine discipline of Freeski Slopestyle. 

At the Alpine, Nordic and Biathlon World Championships 2017 in St. Moritz (SUI), Lahti (FIN) and Hochfilzen (AUT) the Fischer equipped athletes took 45 gold-, 43 silver- and 38 bronze medals – a total of 126 medals. At the 2019 World Championships in Seefeld (AUT), Östersund (SWE)and Åre (SWE) there were 129 medals - 45 gold, 40 silver and 43 bronze.

Affiliated companies
Fischer Sports has several affiliates:
 Fischer Deutschland GmbH (Germany)
 Fischer France SARL (France)
 Fischer Mukachevo (Ukraine)
 Fischer Skis US, LLC (United States)
 Fischer Footwear SRL, Montebelluna (Italy)
 OOO Fischer (Russia)

In Alpine skiing

Active

Retired

In Nordic skiing

Active

Retired:

References

External links

 

Sporting goods manufacturers of Austria
Fischer
Manufacturing companies established in 1924
Austrian brands
Austrian companies established in 1924
Economy of Upper Austria